Dog violet is the common name for various species of the plant genus Viola with unscented flowers. The term arose to differentiate them from the scented sweet violet. Species so named include:
Viola canina – heath dog violet
Viola labradorica (syn. V. conspersa) – American dog or alpine violet
Viola reichenbachiana – early dog violet
Viola riviniana – common dog violet
The roots and seeds of this plant are toxic and should not be eaten.
A number of species in the genus Erythronium in the family Liliaceae are sometimes referred to as "dog's-tooth violet".

Viola (plant)